Mercury is a commune close to Albertville in the Savoie département in the Auvergne-Rhône-Alpes region in south-eastern France. It is part of the urban area of Albertville.

The inhabitants are called Chevronnais.

Sites and monuments
 Château de Chevron, a 14th-century castle remodelled in the 17th century. Pope Nicolas II was born in the castle.

See also
Communes of the Savoie department

References

External links

Official site

Communes of Savoie